The Ministry of Agriculture was a cabinet ministry of the government of Rhodesia. It was responsible for overseeing the nation's agricultural development.

The Ministry of Agriculture was established during the colonial period of Southern Rhodesia. It retained the same structure when Rhodesia unilaterally declared independence in 1965. The Ministry of Agriculture employed more black Africans than any other branches of the Rhodesian civil service. Many black Africans served as Ministry of Agriculture extension officers and conservation officials. The Ministry also published the Rhodesian Agricultural Journal.

The Ministry was led by the Minister of Agriculture, who was appointed by Prime Minister. The first Minister of Agriculture following the UDI was The Duke of Montrose, and the last was Mark Partridge. In 1979, Rhodesia became Zimbabwe Rhodesia as part of the Internal Settlement. In 1980 Zimbabwe gained its independence and the Ministry was succeeded by the Ministry of Agriculture of Zimbabwe.

List of Ministers of Agriculture

Agriculture

Irrigation/Water Development

Native Agriculture/Marketing

References 

History of Rhodesia
Agriculture
Rhodesia, Minister of Agriculture of
Rhodesia, Ministry of Agriculture of
Agriculture
Agriculture
1923 establishments in Southern Rhodesia
Agriculture
Agriculture in Rhodesia